The Quây Sơn River (chữ Nôm: 滝𡇸山, 滝桂山) or as the Guichun River as it is known in China, (Chinese: 归春河,) is a river that passes through Cao Bằng Province, Vietnam and Guangxi province, China. The river originates in China in Jingxi County in the Chongshan Mountain Range (Chinese:崇山峻岭, Pinyin: Chóngshān jùnlǐng).

For part of its length it runs along the Chinese–Vietnamese border, including the scenic Bản Giốc–Detian Falls.

References

Rivers of Cao Bằng province
Rivers of Guangxi
Rivers of Vietnam